You Get It, Man (Kužiš stari moj) is a 1973 Croatian film directed by Vanča Kljaković, starring Ivica Vidović, Eva Ras and Relja Bašić. It is based on 's novel of the same name.

References

External links
 

1973 films
Croatian comedy-drama films
1970s Croatian-language films
Yugoslav comedy-drama films
Jadran Film films
Films based on Croatian novels
Films set in Zagreb